Dot Lake Village (Kelt’aaddh Menn’ in Tanacross Athabascan) is a census-designated place (CDP) in Southeast Fairbanks Census Area, Alaska, United States. The population was 62 at the 2010 census, up from 38 in 2000.

Geography
Dot Lake Village is located at  (63.650261, -144.042721).

Demographics

Dot Lake Village first appeared on the 2000 U.S. Census as a census-designated place (CDP). It was subdivided from Dot Lake CDP, which surrounds Dot Lake Village, in order to establish a separate native village.

As of the census of 2000, there were 38 people, 15 households, and 10 families residing in the CDP. The population density was 10.5 people per square mile (4.0/km2). There were 25 housing units at an average density of 6.9/sq mi (2.7/km2). The racial makeup of the CDP was 23.68% White, 57.89% Native American, and 18.42% from two or more races.

There were 15 households, out of which 53.3% had children under the age of 18 living with them, 33.3% were married couples living together, 13.3% had a female householder with no husband present, and 26.7% were non-families. 26.7% of all households were made up of individuals, and 13.3% had someone living alone who was 65 years of age or older. The average household size was 2.53 and the average family size was 3.00.

In the CDP, the population was spread out, with 34.2% under the age of 18, 7.9% from 18 to 24, 21.1% from 25 to 44, 26.3% from 45 to 64, and 10.5% who were 65 years of age or older. The median age was 32 years. For every 100 females, there were 171.4 males. For every 100 females age 18 and over, there were 127.3 males.

The median income for a household in the CDP was $16,250, and the median income for a family was $16,667. Males had a median income of $28,750 versus $0 for females. The per capita income for the CDP was $7,476. None of the families and 19.0% of the population were below the poverty line. None of those under the age of 18 or above the age of 65 were living below the poverty line.

References

Tanana Athabaskans
Census-designated places in Alaska
Census-designated places in Southeast Fairbanks Census Area, Alaska
Census-designated places in Unorganized Borough, Alaska